Zelena is a village in Chortkiv Raion (district) of Ternopil Oblast (province) in western Ukraine. It belongs to Buchach urban hromada, one of the hromadas of Ukraine. Strypa River (left tributary of the Dniester river) flows near of the village.

History 
First written mention comes from the early 18th century. Then  belonged to the Polish–Lithuanian Commonwealth, from 1772 until 1918 to Austrian (Habsburg monarchy, Austrian Empire, Austria-Hungary) empires, in 1918-1919 to West Ukrainian People's Republic. From 1991 belonged to Ukraine. 

Reading room of Ukrainian society Prosvita operated in the village.

Until 18 July 2020, Zelena belonged to Buchach Raion. The raion was abolished in July 2020 as part of the administrative reform of Ukraine, which reduced the number of raions of Ternopil Oblast to three. The area of Buchach Raion was merged into Chortkiv Raion.

Attractions 
 Church of the Nativity of the Blessed Virgin Mary (1882, reconcstr. 1990)
 Chapel 
 Statue of the Holy Virgin Mary 
 Memory Cross after the abolition of serfdom
 Monument to the fallen in the German-Soviet War soldiers villagers (1968)

People 
 pr. Vasyl (Limnychenko)
 pr. Yuliian (Dobrylovs'kyi)
 Petro Gadz, hero of Ukraine.

References

Sources

External links 

 Zelena, google maps
  Зелена, Тернопільська область, Бучацький район

Villages in Chortkiv Raion